there have been 23 members appointed to the Cabinet of the United States who had been born outside the present-day United States.

Alexander Hamilton, one of the  Founding Fathers who signed the United States Constitution, was the first Cabinet member to be born outside of the United States. President George Washington appointed Hamilton, born in Nevis in 1755 or in 1757, as the United States' first  Secretary of Treasury in 1789. Irish-born James McHenry, whom Washington appointed as Secretary of War in 1796 and who served in the same post in John Adams's administration, was the other foreign-born individual in Washington's cabinet.

Albert Gallatin, born in the Republic of Geneva (in present-day Switzerland) in 1761, became the third foreign-born member of the Cabinet when named Secretary of Treasury by President Thomas Jefferson in 1801. Gallatin, his successor George Campbell,  William Duane, Carl Schurz and James Wilson were the only foreign-born members to hold Cabinet positions in the 19th century. In the 20th century, nine foreign-born individuals were appointed to the Cabinet, including German-born Oscar Straus and Mexican-born George Romney (George Romney, born to American parents, became the father of former Governor of Massachusetts, 2012 Republican U.S. presidential candidate and current U.S. Senator from Utah Mitt Romney.) During the 2001 to 2009 presidency of President George W. Bush, three foreign-born individuals became members of his Cabinet—Elaine Chao and Mel Martinez in 2001; Carlos Gutierrez in 2005.

The Department of Treasury has had the most foreign-born secretaries, with five. The  Department of Labor and the  Department of the Interior follow with three, and the departments of Housing and Urban Development and  State have each had two. Former  secretaries of state Henry Kissinger and Madeleine Albright were the highest-ranking foreign-born Cabinet members ever in accordance to the United States presidential line of succession. The majority of foreign-born Cabinet members were born in Europe. Most European-born Cabinet members originated from the United Kingdom and Germany (with five and four respectively), and the others were born in Ireland, Czechoslovakia, Switzerland and Italy. Four Cabinet members were born in the Americas, and one was born in Asia. The departments of Defense, Justice, Health and Human Services, and Education have not had foreign-born secretaries.

Since most foreign-born Cabinet members are not natural-born citizens—meaning that they were not born in the United States or born abroad to American parents—they are ineligible to exercise the powers of the president of the United States in the event that "neither a President nor Vice President" is able to "discharge the powers and duties" of the presidency as specified in the  Presidential Succession Act of 1947. A notable exception was HUD Secretary George W. Romney, who was a birthright U.S. citizen because his parents were U.S. citizens and, in fact, had been a candidate in the Republican presidential primaries the prior year.

Permanent Cabinet members

Current departments
The Department of Defense was established in 1947; no foreign-born person has served yet. The Department of Justice was established in 1870; no foreign-born person has served as Attorney General yet. The Department of Education was established in 1979; no foreign-born person has served yet.

 denotes the first foreign-born secretary of that particular department

Defunct departments
 The Postmaster General ceased to be a member of the Cabinet when the Post Office Department was re-organized into the United States Postal Service, a special agency independent of the executive branch, by the 1970 Postal Reorganization Act. No foreign-born person had ever served while it was a Cabinet post.
 The Secretaries of the Navy, of the Air Force, and of the Army ceased to be members of the Cabinet when the Department of the Navy was absorbed into the Department of Defense in 1947. No foreign-born person had ever served while they were a Cabinet posts.

 denotes the first foreign-born secretary of that particular department

Cabinet-level officials
The president may designate additional officials as members of the Cabinet. These positions have not always been in the Cabinet, so some female officeholders may not be listed.

The following list includes those who were born outside of the United States and have held cabinet-level positions other than the 15 executive departments.

 denotes the first foreign-born head of that particular agency

See also
List of African-American United States Cabinet members
List of female United States Cabinet members
List of Hispanic and Latino American United States Cabinet members
List of U.S. state governors born outside the United States
List of United States senators born outside the United States

Notes

References

Cabinet
+